Hub District (Lasi), is a coastal administrative district of Balochistan Province, Pakistan. Hub District is created after bifurcating Lasbela District in 2022.

Sardar Muhammad Saleh Bhootani confirmed that the creation of Hub District is a long-standing demand of the people of PB-49 constituency.

MNA Muhammad Aslam Bhootani has thanked Chief Minister Bizenjo for approving the creation of this district.

Administrative divisions 

The district of Hub is administratively divided in five tehsils.

 Hub 
 Sonmiani  
 Gaddani 
 Sakran 
 Dureji 

Union Councils are given below:

Demographics 

At the time of the 2017 census the district had a population of 339,640, of which 177,565 were males and 162,070 females. Rural population was 111,768 (32.91%) while the urban population was 227,872 (67.09%). The literacy rate was 35.90% - the male literacy rate was 45.37% while the female literacy rate was 25.49%. Islam was the predominant religion with 97.93%, while Hindus are 1.67% of the population.

At the time of the 2017 census, 58.31% of the population spoke Balochi, 18.51% Sindhi, 15.80% Brahui, 4.08% Pashto and 1.22% Saraiki as their first language.

See also 
 Hub Dam
 Hub Tehsil
 Hub Industrial & Trading Estate
 Hub River
 Hub District
 Divisions of Pakistan
 List of districts in Balochistan

References

Districts of Pakistan
Districts of Balochistan, Pakistan
Populated places in Balochistan, Pakistan
2022 establishments in Pakistan